Revolution 2020: Love, Corruption, Ambition is a 2011 novel by Chetan Bhagat. Its story is concerned with a love triangle, corruption and a journey of self-discovery. R2020 has addressed the issue of how private coaching institutions exploit aspiring engineering students and how parents put their lifetime's earnings on stake for these classes so that their children can crack engineering exams and change the fortune of the family. While a handful accomplish their dreams, others sink into disaster. The book is available as an Audiobook on Amazon.

The author stated that the novel is based on the "rampant corruption" apparent in the Indian educational system, with the choice of Varanasi as a setting emerging through "a special connection to the city" following his visit. He further said "it is one of our oldest cities, and people there now have modern aspirations. I thought the contrast would be interesting. The city also has a lot of character."

Plot 
This book follows the story of two friends separated by their ambitions and passions yet connected by their love for the same girl. While Gopal, who has experienced the harsh realities of life due to poverty aspires to become rich, his friend Raghav is a boy from a well-off family who desires to create a revolution in India by fighting corruption.

Aarti and Gopal have been childhood friends since  but have a platonic relationship. As teenagers, Gopal pushes Aarti for more, but she later reveals that she was not ready for anything. Gopal gets a low ranking in the AIEEE exams while Raghav is among the toppers. Gopal moves to Kota to join reputed coaching classes to help with his ranking. Raghav becomes a celebrity in the town after he passes the IIT entrance exam. Aarti falls for Raghav during Gopal's absence. Aarti and Gopal chat online, and Aarti reveals her relationship to Gopal, who is heartbroken. He studies hard but gets a low ranking in the AIEEE exam for the second time. His father dies shortly after . Raghav decides to become a journalist and pursue a career in a newspaper publishing house.

Meanwhile, Gopal is contacted by a politician who wishes to build an engineering college on the highly valuable land that Gopal's family owns. Gopal agrees to the deal, and joins the system of corruption in India in order to build the college with the politician's black money. He is tired of giving white envelopes to officials but has no other choice. Raghav, now a journalist, exposes the corruption-funded college and is eventually fired from the newshouse. Raghav starts his own newspaper, Revolution 2020, to change the world and expose the corrupt system in India. After another expose, Raghav's newspaper is shut down by politicians and thugs, and he loses almost everything.

Raghav is still passionate about his activism and forgets about Aarti. They are still unmarried. Aarti and Gopal reconnect and often meet after work in coffee shops and other places, unbeknownst to Raghav. Gopal books a hotel room in the same hotel that Aarti works. Gopal seduces Aarti who returns his love, giving in to years of suppressed feelings. Aarti falls in love with Gopal, and begins to cheat on Raghav. Gopal then decides to disclose to Raghav that him and Aarti are a couple. Gopal goes to Raghav's office but a chance encounter with a poor farmer and his kid who had come to Raghav for help shakes him up and he realizes the folly of money, power and wealth. He decides to let go of Aarti perhaps realising they were never meant to be together and Raghav would always remain Aarti's love. He with the help of politician invites two prostitutes as a part of his birthday surprise and ensures Aarti witnesses it, making her hate him forever. He anonymously helps Raghav get a job, and suggests he become a politician (MLA) to bring about the revolution he desired. Aarti and Raghav thereafter got married.

Gopal becomes a rich and successful businessman, but is still heartbroken over Aarti. Despite sacrificing his lifelong love to bring about the revolution, Gopal still doubts whether he is a good man or not. After listening to Gopal's story, the author confirms that he is indeed a good man.

Reviews
 Rituparna Chatterjee Review. IBN Live
 Daily Bhaskar Review
 Stories In Moments Review

References

External links
Inspirational & Lively Quotes from REVOLUTION 2020 – Chetan Bhagat
Revolution 2020 in silver screen

2011 Indian novels
Indian English-language novels
Novels set in Varanasi
Rupa Publications books
Indian Institutes of Technology in fiction
Novels by Chetan Bhagat